Pyrgillus is a genus of fungi in the family Pyrenulaceae.

References

External links
Pyrgillus at Index Fungorum

Eurotiomycetes genera
Pyrenulales
Taxa named by William Nylander (botanist)